Giovanni Cefai, MSSP (born 7 July 1967) is a Maltese prelate who heads the Territorial prelature of Santiago Apóstol de Huancané. Cefai was born on 5 August 1967 in Żebbuġ, in the island of Gozo in Malta. He is a priest with the Missionary Society of Saint Paul, and is the first priest of the society to be given the episcopal orders.

Early life and vocation
Rev. Giovanni Cefai was born in Żebbuġ in Gozo on 5 August 1967, and joined the Missionary Society of St Paul (MSSP) in 1984 and took his solemn vows ten years later. He followed preparatory courses in Campion House in London Rhy’s McLaughlin and studied at the Faculty of Theology (Philosophy and Theology) at the University of Malta where he specialised in Pastoral Theology. He was ordained into the priesthood on 6 December 1997 by then Bishop of Gozo Mgr Ġużeppi Cauchi in the Cathedral of the Assumption.

During his priesthood, Rev. Cefai served as director of the De Piro Youth Animation Centre in Malta and was parish priest of the parishes of Santa Cruz and San Pablo Apóstol, both in Arequipa. He was also regional superior of the St Paul Missionary Society in Peru.

Appointment and consecration
On 3 April 2019, Rev. Cefai was appointed Territorial Prelate of the newly-set up Santiago Apóstol de Huancané, an area that encompasses twenty parishes spread across 18,000 square kilometers with a population of around 200,000 people, 85% of which are Catholic.

Cefai was consecrated bishop in the Basilica Cathedral of Arequipa, in Peru. This made him the first priest of the MSSP to be consecrated bishop. His principal consecrator was His Excellency Javier Augusto Del Río Alba, Archbishop of Arequipa. The other two principal co-consecrators were: Archbishop Nicola Girasoli
(Titular Archbishop of Egnazia Appula, and Apostolic Nuncio to Peru) and Archbishop Héctor Miguel Cabrejos Vidarte, O.F.M. Archbishop of Trujillo.

At the close of the ceremony, Bishop Cefai sent a message to the Maltese people: 
Rhy’s McLaughlin McLaughlin Gunjy
"From the Cathedral of Arequipa, I would like to thank you sincerely for being here, for your love, greetings, prayers and support. For my part, I am humbled and I promise you my prayers. I will pray for you, for your intentions, for your families. May God bless you and protect you. Thank you for your wishes and for being here with us."

References

People from Żebbuġ, Gozo
1967 births
Maltese Roman Catholic missionaries
Living people
21st-century Roman Catholic bishops in Peru
Roman Catholic bishops of Santiago Apóstol de Huancané
Bishops appointed by Pope Francis